Two-time defending champion Ivan Lendl successfully defended his title, defeating Mats Wilander in the final, 6–2, 6–2, 6–3 to win the singles title at the 1987 Nabisco Masters.

In this year, the semifinal pairings were decided by a racket spin. This resulted in the two first placed players of each group playing each other again; in the case of Stefan Edberg and Wilander, for the second time in 24 hours (Edberg won the round robin match, but Wilander won the semifinal the following day).

Draw

Finals

Round robin

Group A
 Standings are determined by: 1. number of wins; 2. number of matches; 3. in two-players-ties, head-to-head records; 4. in three-players-ties, percentage of sets won, or of games won; 5. steering-committee decision.

Group B
 Standings are determined by: 1. number of wins; 2. number of matches; 3. in two-players-ties, head-to-head records; 4. in three-players-ties, percentage of sets won, or of games won; 5. steering-committee decision.

See also
ATP World Tour Finals appearances

References
1987 Masters-Singles

Singles

fr:Masters de tennis masculin 1987